The People's Record is the seventh studio album by Swedish band Club 8.

Reception

The People's Record received mixed to positive reviews from critics. On Metacritic, the album holds a score of 67/100 based on 6 reviews, indicating "generally favorable reviews."

Track listing
 "Western Hospitality" - 3:49
 "Isn't That Great?" - 4:21
 "Shape Up!" - 3:17
 "Dancing with the Mentally Ill" - 3:56
 "My Pessimistic Heart" - 3:05
 "Back to A" - 3:30
 "Like Me" - 3:10
 "Be Mad, Get Ill, Be Still" - 3:11
 "We're All Going to Die" - 3:36
 "The People Speak" - 5:06

References

2010 albums
Club 8 albums
Labrador Records albums